Anna Karenina is a 1915 American silent drama film directed by J. Gordon Edwards and starring Betty Nansen.  It was the first American adaptation of the 1878 novel by Leo Tolstoy. The film is considered to be lost. Some scenes were shot on location at a ski resort near Montreal.

Plot
Anna Karenina is a married aristocrat and socialite living in Saint Petersburg. She is living a torrid romance with a wealthy and young count, he loves her and is willing to marry her once she leave her husband.

However, Russian society's rejection makes her feel isolated, possessive and even paranoid due to her infidelity's suspicions which will lead eventually to her  suicide.

Cast
 Betty Nansen as Anna Karenina
 Edward José as Baron Alexis Karenin
 Richard Thornton as Prince Vronsky
 Stella Hammerstein

See also
 List of lost films
 1937 Fox vault fire

References

Bibliography
 Krefft, Vanda. The Man Who Made the Movies: The Meteoric Rise and Tragic Fall of William Fox. HarperCollins, 2017.

External links
 
 
 
 

1915 films
1910s historical drama films
1915 lost films
American historical drama films
American silent feature films
American black-and-white films
Films based on Anna Karenina
Films directed by J. Gordon Edwards
Films about infidelity
Films shot in Montreal
Fox Film films
Lost drama films
Lost American films
1915 drama films
1910s American films
Silent American drama films
1910s English-language films